Howrah railway station (also known as Howrah Junction or Howrah Terminus) is a railway station located in the city of Howrah, West Bengal, India. It is the oldest and largest railway complex in India. Along with being the busiest railway station in India, it is also one of the busiest and largest train stations in the world. As per Indian Green Building Council, it was awarded CII-IGBC Silver Rating becoming the first green railway station among metropolitan cities in India.

The station inaugurated its journey on August 15th, 1854 with the first railway line being built between Howrah – Hooghly Main Line. At present, about 600 passenger trains pass through the station serving more than one million passengers on a daily basis. In addition, utilizing its 23 platforms, it handles a total number of 252 Mail/Express trains, 500 suburban EMUs daily. Of the 23 platforms, 10 are long enough to cater to trains with more than 24 coaches. Goods and parcel trains also originate and terminate here. The Howrah–Barddhaman main line is the busiest line that connects this station.

The book Vibrant Edifice: The Saga of Howrah Station by Eastern Railways was released in 2005.

History

In 1849, a contract was signed between the East Indian Railway Company and East India Company and an initial amount allocated for the first section between Howrah and Raneegunge (Raniganj) via Pandooah (Pandua, Hooghly) and Burdwan (Bardhaman). Frederick Walter Simms, the consulting engineer to Government of India, initially envisaged a station on the right side of Hooghly in 1846. However following the fund sanctioning, Howrah was chosen as the location of the terminus for the new line. In the coming years, the question of connecting the rail line to Calcutta was discussed frequently.

On 17 June 1851, George Turnbull, the Chief Engineer of the East Indian Railway Company and his team of engineers submitted plans for a railway station at Howrah. Not realizing the future importance of railways in the country, the government authorities decided not to purchase the land and expensive water front needed for the project in January, 1852. Turnbull then developed alternative development plans that estimated the cost at 250,000 rupees. In October 1852, four tenders for the building of the station were received: they varied from 190,000 to 274,526 rupees. The size of the construction project - of whether Howrah should be a large station or Howrah be a smaller station in favour of a larger station being developed at another time - was debated from time to time during this process. Eventually land was bought.

There was a gap between laying the line and opening it up since the ship carrying the carriages sank while the locomotive ended up in Australia. Eventually the carriages were built locally and the locomotive was directed to Calcutta. The first public departure from Howrah for the 23.5 miles to Hooghly was on 15 August 1854. During this period, the station was located at what is now the office of the divisional railway manager of Howrah. It consisted of one line and platform, a ticket window and a supporting building. Two weeks later the line to Pundoah was opened. In the first 4 months, over 109,000 passengers used the service. The locomotive was of the same type as the Fairy Queen.

Indians on their way to European colonies in the early 1800s came through the Howrah Station.

The increase of residents in the region around Howrah and Kolkata and the booming economy lead to an increasing demand for rail travel. Also, the rail network kept on growing continuously, e.g. was the bridge over the Rupnarayan River at Kolaghat completed on 19 April 1900 and connected Howrah with Kharagpur. The Bengal-Nagpur Railway was extended to Howrah in 1900, thus making Howrah an important railway centre. So in 1901, a new station building was proposed. The British architect Halsey Ricardo designed the new station. It was opened to the public on 1 December 1905, and completed by 1911.

In the 1980s, the station was expanded to 15 platforms. At the same time, a new Yatri Niwas (transit passenger facility) was built south of the original station frontage.

The new terminal complex was finished in 1992, creating a total of 19 platforms. This was extended by a further four platforms in 2009.

On 3 March 1969, the inaugural Rajdhani Express departed Howrah for New Delhi. In October 2011, India's first double-decker train, Howrah–Dhanbad Double Decker Express, left Howrah for Dhanbad. The first service of the Antyodaya Express, the Howrah–Ernakulam Antyodaya Express, was inaugurated in February 2017.

Tram terminus, Howrah 
Until 1992, there was a tram terminus at Howrah Station. Trams departed for Sealdah Station, Rajabazar, Shyambazar, High Court, Dalhousie Square, Park Circus, Ballygunge, Tollygunge etc. Trams also departed for Bandhaghat and Shibpur. The tram terminus was partially closed in 1971 while the Bandhaghat and Shibpur lines were closed. Many unauthorized vehicles and pedestrians began to traverse the tram tracks and so the routes were not continued. The terminus station was converted to underpasses and a bus terminus. The part of the tram terminus for other routes continued to function until 1992, when the Rabindra Setu (Howrah Bridge) was declared unfit to carry trams because it was a cantilever bridge.

Heritage museum
The nearby Rail Museum, Howrah was opened in 2006, and contains a section dedicated to the heritage and history of Howrah railway station. The railway museum, located south of the station, displays artefacts of historical importance related to the development of Eastern Railway. From 1909 to 1943 the Fairy Queen, the world's oldest operational steam locomotive, was displayed on a plinth inside the station.

Rail services

The Eastern Railway runs local trains to Belur Math, Tarakeswar, Arambagh, Goghat, Katwa, Bandel, Sheoraphuli, Bardhaman, Serampore and numerous intermediate stations (see Howrah–Bardhaman main line, Howrah–Bardhaman chord and Tarakeswar branch line). There are also mail and express trains to Central, North and North-East India. A narrow-gauge line formerly used to connect Bardhaman and Katwa, served by DMU trains; but now this line is also converted to broad gauge and used by EMU trains like all the other lines.

The South Eastern Railway, operates local trains to Amta, Mecheda, Panskura, Haldia, Tamluk, Medinipur and Kharagpur and mail and express trains to Central, West and South India. South Eastern Railway, connects with the Great Indian Peninsular Railway (GIPR) route to Mumbai and Chennai.

The Eastern Railway and South Eastern Railway sections are connected by two links. One is the LiluaTikiapara link and the other is the RajchandrapurDankuniMourigram link. They are used by goods trains and the Sealdah–Puri Duronto Express avoiding Howrah.

Four major rail routes end at Howrah. They are the Howrah–Delhi, Howrah–Mumbai, Howrah–Chennai and Howrah–Guwahati routes.

After completion Kolkata Metro Line 2 will pass through Howrah Station.

Station facilities
The station is the divisional headquarters for the Eastern Railway.

The station has 23 platforms. Platforms 1 to 16 are located in the old complex, referred to as "Terminal 1". It serves the local and long-distance trains of Eastern Railway and local trains of South Eastern Railway. Platforms 17 to 23 are in the new complex, referred to as "Terminal 2". It serves the long-distance trains of South Eastern Railway.

There is a large covered waiting area between the main complex and the platforms and other areas for passengers awaiting connecting trains. Free wifi is present at the station. In addition, there is a transit passenger facility with dormitory, single-room and double-room accommodation. First-class passengers wait in an air-conditioned area with balcony views of the Kolkata Skyline and the Howrah Bridge.

The station platforms have carriageways for motor vehicles within the complex including two carriageways to platforms 8 and 9 for Eastern Railway and to platforms 21 and 22 for South Eastern Railway. Flyovers at the ends of the platforms allow motor vehicles to exit the complex quickly.

Sampath Rail Yatri Niwas and Regional Rail Museum are a part of "Terminal 2" Howrah station complex.

Services for rolling stock

The station has a diesel-locomotive shed with room for 84 locomotives. The electric-locomotive shed has room for 96 locomotives. There is also an electric-trip shed with the capacity to hold up to 20 locomotives. The sheds accommodate 175+ WAP-4, WAP-5, and WAP-7 locomotives. The EMU car shed has over 15 parking slots. The station has a coach maintenance complex.

Connectivity

Metro station 

underground station, a part of Line 2 of the Kolkata Metro serves the area. It will be the deepest station on the East-West Metro line of the Kolkata Metro and further the deepest in the country. The connecting metro stations will be Howrah Maidan to the west and Mahakaran to the east.

Gallery

See also
 Kolkata Metro
 Kolkata railway station
 Kolkata suburban railway
 List of Kolkata Metro stations
 Santragachi railway station
 Sealdah railway station
 Shalimar railway station
 Trams in Kolkata

References

Works cited

Further reading

External links

Howrah railway division
Kolkata Metro stations
Kolkata Suburban Railway stations
Railway junction stations in West Bengal
Railway stations in India opened in 1854
Railway stations in Howrah district
Railway stations in Kolkata
Tourist attractions in Howrah
Rail transport in Howrah
Railway terminus in India
Indian Railway A1 Category Stations
1854 establishments in India